The superior gastric plexus (gastric or coronary plexus) accompanies the left gastric artery along the lesser curvature of the stomach, and joins with branches from the left vagus nerve.

The term "inferior gastric plexus" is sometimes used to describe a continuation of the hepatic plexus.

Additional images

References

External links
 

Nerve plexus
Nerves of the torso